Connecticut's 49th House of Representatives district elects one member of the Connecticut House of Representatives. It encompasses parts of Windham and has been represented by Democrat Susan Johnson since 2009.

Recent elections

2020

2018

2016

2014

2012

References

49